Gold Award for Best Actor in a Supporting Role is an award given by Zee TV as part of its annual Gold Awards for Indian television series and artists, to recognize a male actor who has delivered an outstanding performance in a supporting role.

The award was first awarded in 2007 and since has been separated in two categories, Critics Award and Popular Award. Critics Award is given by the chosen jury of critics assigned to the function while Popular Award is given on the basis of public voting.

Superlatives

List of winners

2000s
2007 Rajesh Khera - Left Right Left as Cadet Sahni
Hiten Tejwani - Kyunki Saas Bhi Kabhi Bahu Thi as Karan Virani 
Akshay Anand - Saat Phere...Saloni Ka Safar as Brijesh Pratap Singh
Jamnadas Majethia - Baa Bahoo Aur Baby  as Dr. Harshad Thakkar 
Ali Asgar - Kahaani Ghar Ghar Kii as Kamal Agarwal
Arjun Bijlani - Left Right Left as Cadet Aalekh Sharma
2008 Alok Nath - Sapna Babul Ka...Bidaai as Prakashchand 
Yatin Karyekar - Ghar Ki Lakshmi Betiyaan as Suryakant 
Anoop Soni - Balika Vadhu  as Bhairav
 Jay Bhanushali - Kayamath as Neev Shergill
Vikram Gokhale - Jeevan Saathi as Vikram Rathod
2009 Not Held

2010s
2010 Ayub Khan - Uttaran as Jogi Thakur
Anoop Soni - Balika Vadhu  as Bhairav
Vikram Gokhale - Mera Naam Karegi Roshan as Thakur Veer Pratap Singh
Vinay Rohrra - Laagi Tujhse Lagan as Bajirao
Amit Pachori - Jhansi Ki Rani as Tatya Tope 
2011 Ayub Khan - Uttaran as Jogi Thakur
Anoop Soni - Balika Vadhu  as Bhairav
Gireesh Sahedev - Navya..Naye Dhadkan Naye Sawaal as Girish Sachdev
Shiv Kumar Subramaniam - Mukti Bandhan as I.M.Virani
2012 Anoop Soni - Balika Vadhu  as Bhairav
Jai Kalra - Bade Achhe Lagte Hain as Vikram Shergill 
Gaurav Chopra - Uttaran as Raghuvendra Prathap Rathore
Vivek Mushran - Parvarrish – Kuchh Khattee Kuchh Meethi as  Lucky Singh Ahluwalia
2013 Vaquar Shaikh - Qubool Hai as Rashid Khan
Rithvik Dhanjani - Pavitra Rishta as Arjun Digvijay Kirloskar
Jai Kalra - Bade Achhe Lagte Hain as Vikram Shergill 
Gaurav Chopra - Uttaran as Raghuvendra Prathap Rathore 
Mukesh Khanna - Pyaar Ka Dard Hai Meetha Meetha Pyaara Pyaara as Purushottam Deewan
Chetan Pandit - Punar Vivaah as Suraj Pratap Sindhia
2014 Vishal Singh - Saath Nibhaana Saathiya as Jigar Modi
Aham Sharma - Mahabharat as Karna
Sameer Dharmadhikari - Buddha as Sudhodhana
Gaurav Chopra - Uttaran as Raghuvendra Prathap Rathore
Arav Chowdhary - Mahabharat as Bhishma
Rohit Bhardwaj - Mahabharat as Yudhishtra
2015 Raj Singh Arora - Ye Hai Mohabbatein as Mihir Arora (tied with) Vishal Singh - Saath Nibhaana Saathiya as Jigar Modi
2016 Raj Singh Arora - Ye Hai Mohabbatein as Mihir Arora (tied with) Arjit Taneja - Kumkum Bhagya as Purab Mehra
 Varun Badola - Mere Angne Mein as Raghav Srivastava
2017 Vishal Singh - Yeh Rishta Kya Kehlata Hai as Naitik Singhania
Vin Rana - Kumkum Bhagya as Purab Khanna
Kunal Jaisingh - Ishqbaaaz as Omkara Singh Oberoi
Raj Singh Arora - Ye Hai Mohabbatein as Mihir Arora
2018 Manit Joura - Kundali Bhagya as Risabh Luthra (tied with) Kunal Jaisingh - Ishqbaaaz as Omkara Singh Oberoi
Vin Rana - Kumkum Bhagya as Purab Khanna
Mohit Malik - Kullfi Kumarr Bajewala as Sikander Gill
Vishal Singh - Yeh Rishta Kya Kehlata Hai as Naitik Singhania
Sudesh Berry -Shakti - Astitva Ke Ehsaas Ki as Harak Singh
2019 Ritvik Arora - Yeh Rishtey Hain Pyaar Ke as Kunal Rajvansh
Manit Joura - Kundali Bhagya as Risabh Luthra
Vin Rana - Kumkum Bhagya as Purab Khanna
Uday Tikekar - Kasautii Zindagii Kay (2018 TV series) as Moloy Basu
Karan Khanna - Divya Drishti as Daitya Vanar
Rajat Dahiya - Tujhse Hai Raabta as Sarthak Rane

References

Best Actor in a Supporting Role
Film awards for supporting actor